HD 169830 b is an extrasolar planet three times the mass of Jupiter. Due to its high mass, it is most likely a gas giant planet, akin to Jupiter and Saturn in the Solar System. This planet at 0.8 AU is slightly farther out than Venus is in the Solar System, orbiting around its star every 262 days.

See also 
 HD 169830 c

References

 

Sagittarius (constellation)
Giant planets
Exoplanets discovered in 2000
Exoplanets detected by radial velocity